Marko Lekić (born 19 February 1985) is a Serbian former professional basketball player.

Professional career 
A center, Milošević played for Partizan, Spartak, Atlas Belgrade, and Vojvodina Srbijagas prior he joined Crvena zvezda in January 2008. Afterwards, he played for Slovan, Budućnost, Kryvbas, Helios Suns, and AZS Koszalin.

References

External links
 Marko Lekic at eurobasket.com
 Marko Lekic at realgm.com
 Marko Lekic at proballers.com
 Marko Lekic at aba-liga.com
 Marko Lekic at basketball-reference.com
 Marko Lekic at euroleague.net

1985 births
Living people
ABA League players
AZS Koszalin players
Basketball League of Serbia players
Centers (basketball)
KD Slovan players
KK Beopetrol/Atlas Beograd players
KK Budućnost players
KK Crvena zvezda players
KK Partizan players
KK Spartak Subotica players
SC Kryvbas players
Serbian expatriate basketball people in Montenegro
Serbian expatriate basketball people in Poland
Serbian expatriate basketball people in Slovenia
Serbian expatriate basketball people in Ukraine
Serbian men's basketball players
Sportspeople from Valjevo
Helios Suns players